Below Deck Mediterranean is an American reality television series that premiered on Bravo on May 3, 2016. Developed as the first spin-off of Below Deck, it has aired seven seasons. An 8th season has been announced to premiere in 2023.

The series chronicles the lives of the crew members who work and reside aboard a 150-foot-plus superyacht during a charter season in Greece (Season 1), Croatia (Seasons 2 and 6), Italy (Season 3), France (Season 4), Spain (Season 5) and Malta (Season 7) which consists of filming for around six weeks with the cast temporarily replacing the conventional crew.

Yachts

Summary 
Ionian Princess at 46m/150ft
Sirocco built by Dutch shipyard Heesen 2006|2013 at 47m/154ft
Talisman Maiton at 54m/178ft
The Wellington (aka the Wellesley) built by Dutch shipyard OceanCo 1993|2016
Lady Michelle
Home built by Dutch shipyard Heesen 2017 at 49m (160ft)

Specifications

Cast

Season 1: Ionian Princess
Mark Howard – Captain
Bryan Kattenburg – Bosun (ep 1), First Officer (ep 1–13)
Ben Robinson – Chef
Hannah Ferrier – Chief Stewardess
Julia d'Albert Pusey – 2nd Stewardess
Tiffany Copeland – 3rd Stewardess
Danny Zureikat – Deckhand (ep 1–12)
Jen Riservato – Deckhand
Bobby Giancola – Deckhand

Season 2: Sirocco
Sandra "Sandy" Yawn – Captain
Adam Glick – Chef
Hannah Ferrier – Chief Stewardess
Christine "Bugsy" Drake – 2nd Stewardess
Lauren Cohen – 3rd Stewardess
Wesley Walton – Bosun
Malia White – Deckhand (ep 1–10), Lead Deckhand (ep 11–14)
Max Hagley – Deckhand 
Bobby Giancola – Deckhand

Season 3: Talisman Maiton
 Sandra "Sandy" Yawn – Captain
Adam Glick – Chef
Hannah Ferrier – Chief Stewardess
Brooke Laughton – 2nd Stewardess 
Kasey Cohen – 3rd Stewardess 
Conrad Empson – Bosun
João Franco – Lead Deckhand
Colin Macy-O'Toole – Deckhand
Jamie Jason – Deckhand

Season 4: Sirocco
Sandra "Sandy" Yawn – Captain
Mila Kolomeitseva – Chef (ep 1–5)
Ben Robinson – Chef (ep 13–18)
Hannah Ferrier – Chief Stewardess
Aesha Scott – 2nd Stewardess
Anastasia Surmava – 3rd Stewardess (ep 1–4, 13–18), Chef (ep 5–12)
June Foster – 3rd Stewardess (ep 7–13)
João Franco – Bosun
Travis Michalzik – Lead Deckhand
Colin Macy-O'Toole – Deckhand
Jack Stirrup – Deckhand

Season 5: The Wellington
Sandra "Sandy" Yawn – Captain
Hindrigo "Kiko" Lorran – Chef (ep 1–10)
Tom Checketts – Chef (ep 11–20)
Hannah Ferrier – Chief Stewardess (ep 1–12)
Lara Flumiani – 2nd Stewardess (ep 1–3)
Christine "Bugsy" Drake – 2nd Stewardess (ep 4–11), Chief Stewardess (ep 12–20)
Aesha Scott – 2nd Stewardess (ep 13–20)
Jessica More – 3rd Stewardess
Malia White – Bosun
Peter Hunziker – Lead Deckhand (ep 1–6), Deckhand (ep 7–20) – later fired by the production company.
Alex Radcliffe – Deckhand (ep 1–7), Lead Deckhand (ep 7–20)
Robert Westergaard – Deckhand

Season 6: Lady Michelle
 Sandra "Sandy" Yawn – Captain
Mathew Shea – Chef
Katie Flood – Chief Stewardess
Lexi Wilson – 2nd Stewardess (ep. 1–9), Stewardess (ep. 9–13)
Courtney Veale – 3rd Stewardess (ep. 1–13), Stewardess (ep. 9-13), 2nd Stewardess (ep. 14-18)
Delaney Evans – Stewardess (ep. 9–13)
Malia White – Bosun
David Pascoe – Deckhand (ep.1–16), Lead Deckhand (ep. 17)
Lloyd Spencer – Deckhand
Mzi "Zee" Dempers – Deckhand

Season 7: Home
 Sandra "Sandy" Yawn – Captain
 David White – Chef
 Natasha "Tasha" Webb – Chief Stewardess
 Kyle Viljoen – 2nd Steward (ep. 1-17, ep. 19)
 Natalya "Nat" Scudder – 2nd Steward
 Raygan Tyler – Bosun (ep.1-5)
 Storm Smith – Lead Deckhand (ep.1-5),  Provisional Bosun (ep. 5-9) Bosun (ep. 9-19)
 Mzi "Zee" Dempers – Deckhand
 Jason Gaskell – Deckhand (ep. 1-14)
 Courtney Veale – Deckhand (ep. 6-13), Lead Deckhand (ep.13-19)
 Reid Jenkins - Deckhand (ep. 14-19)
 Elena Dubaich – Stewardess (ep.18-19)

Timeline

Episodes

Broadcast
Below Deck Mediterranean airs on the Bravo cable network in the United States; the first episode premiered on Tuesday at 9/8pm ET/PT on May 3, 2016. A half-hour preview special of the series aired on March 23, 2016. In 2021, the British Channel 4 acquired the series for its E4 'youth' TV channel, with the first episode due to begin on February 22, 2021 at 7:30pm.

Reception

Ratings

Controversies
Chief Steward Hannah Ferrier, who had appeared in the first five seasons, was fired during Season 5 after Malia photographed a box of Valium and an empty THC pen in Ferrier's cabin. Hannah was immediately fired by Captain Sandy and removed from the boat. It later transpired the medication was prescription to help her deal with anxiety. The show faced criticism for the repeated references to Ferrier's medication as "drugs" and using her illness as a plotline.

After 3 episodes of Season 5 had been aired on Bravo, Deckhand Peter Hunziker was fired by the production company for a racist and misogynist posting on social media. His appearances were minimized in later episodes.

References

External links

2010s American reality television series
2020s American reality television series
2016 American television series debuts
Below Deck (franchise)
Bravo (American TV network) original programming
English-language television shows
Reality television spin-offs
Television series by 51 Minds Entertainment
Television series by Endemol
Television shows filmed in Greece
Television shows filmed in Croatia
Television shows filmed in Italy
Television shows filmed in France
Television shows filmed in Spain
Television shows filmed in Malta
American television spin-offs
Yachting